Apartment Life may refer to:
 Apartment Life, the second studio album by indie rock band Ivy
 The Sims 2: Apartment Life, the expansion pack for the video game, The Sims 2
 Metropolitan Home, the publication known from 1974 to 1981 as Apartment Life